Herbert Lankester was an English medical missionary. He led the Church Missionary Society (CMS) for thirty years. His research shifted the role of medical missionaries from agents of religion to agents of health care, leading to the twentieth century model of medical missionaries.

Early life 
Lankester was born in Elm Park Gardens, London, England and lived most of his life in England. It is unknown whether he had any formal education. Though his parents had no medical background, he grew up studying medicine on his own. It is believed that some member(s) of his family became ill, which influenced his interest. In early childhood, his mother battled multiple chronic diseases. Lankester wanted to help his mother get healthy. It is believed that she died while he was in his early teens and that he was brought up by his father. Without any siblings, most of Lankester's time was spent studying medicine.

Missionary call 
Lankester served as a leader for the Church Missionary Society examining board in addition to his role as a secretary. He retired in 1926 after serving there for 30 years  During this period, he served as Secretary of the Auxiliary Committee on Medical Missions, Society Physician, Home Secretary and General Secretary. He published numerous papers as the Honorary Secretary of Committee. In Occasional Paper 1, Lankester wrote an Appeal to the Medical Mission Auxiliary Fund Committee. Lankester worked as a researcher. He enjoyed reading and studying why people became ill. He read every book of medicine that was available at the time.

His work 
Lankester was thoroughly involved with researching health care. He was especially interested in seeing how to better supply medicine to those who needed it around the world. As a long time London resident, Lankester focused his work on rural England. According to records, he supplied medical aid to the London countryside. He set up a tent on the side of one of the main roads outside a small village. He treated many different local people as well as people who traveled to seek his help. He had no real way of promoting his medical services beyond word of mouth. He treated people with a range of illnesses including smallpox, yellow fever, cholera, typhoid, polio and diphtheria.

He started work in England and eventually branched out to other countries. Lankester apparently did not work closely with other medical missionaries, preferring to work independently. His greatest individual medical mission was a three-month stay in the London countryside.

Legacy 
Lankester was one of the first and most trusted medical missionaries. Instead of clergymen traveling the countryside, he wanted public perception of medical missionaries to be heroes spreading health and the Gospel. Lankester traveled across London communicating about medical missionaries. He had trouble conveying what medical missionary work was. He is best known for the studying and research he conducted, as well as his supply of medicine and vaccines to those in the near-London countryside.

References

Sources 
 Arumugam, Thiru. Nineteenth Century American Medical Missionaries in Jaffna, Ceylon: with Special Reference to Samuel Fisk Green. MV Publications, South Asian Studies Centre, 2009.
 Grundmann, Christoffer H. Sent to Heal!: Emergence and Development of Medical Missions. Centre for Contemporary Christianity, 2014.
 
 Connor, Jennifer. Guardians of Medical Knowledge: The Genesis of the Medical Library Association. Lanham,Md./London: Medical Library Association/Scarecrow Press, 2000. 
 

Christian medical missionaries
English Anglican missionaries
Anglican missionaries in the United Kingdom